Singles Only is a collection of singles and re-recordings by The Briefs released in 2004 on CD.

Track listing 
 "Poor and Weird"
 "Rotten Love"
 "(I Think) My Baby Is a Communist"
 "Silver Bullet"
 "C'mon Squash Me a Bug"
 "Benny's Got a Cigarette"
 "Poor and Weird"
 "Where Did He Go?"
 "Sylvia"
 "She's Abrasive"
 "Like a Heart Attack"
 "Love and Ulcers"
 "We Americans"
 "(Looking Through) Gary Glitter's Eyes"
 "Dead in the Suburbs"
 "Ain't It the Truth"
 "This Age"
 "Medication"
 "Come Dancing"

References 

The Briefs albums
2004 compilation albums